The Prosecutor General's Office of Armenia is a government agency tasked for supervising the public procurator system in Armenia, exercising its authority through the Prosecutor General of Armenia. It oversees the enforcement of Armenian law by law enforcement agencies such as the Police of Armenia and the National Security Service. The office is located on 5 Vazgen Sargsyan Street, Yerevan. The current Prosecutor General is Anna Vardapetyan.

History
The Prosecutor General's Office of the First Republic of Armenia began to operate on 6 December 1918, when the ruling council adopted the law "On the application of the laws of the former Russian Empire on the territory of Armenia”. In December 1922, the Soviet Union began to create its own governmental institutions and legal systems. During this period, a prosecutor’s office in the USSR Supreme Court, with a subdivision of that office being created in the Transcaucasian Socialist Federative Soviet Republic (which was one of the predecessors to what is now Armenia) was established. On 20 July 1933, the Office of Public Procurator of the USSR was founded by a joint decision of the Central Executive Committee of the Soviet Union and the Council of People's Commissars, which resulted in the creation of republican affiliate units in Soviet Republics. On 27 February 1959, a board was established in the Soviet prosecutor’s office headed by the chief prosecutor of the Armenian SSR. 

On 5 July 1995, following the collapse of the Soviet Union, the first Constitution of Armenia was adopted. As a result, an independent military and prosecutor's office was established on 5 October of that year. The agency became a full member of the Coordinating Council of Prosecutors General of the Commonwealth of Independent States in 1999 and became a member of the International Association of Prosecutors and the Conference of Prosecutors General of Europe in 2005.

Organizational structure
The office has the following organizational structure:
 
Central office
Investigation department for 
Supervision department
Department for Charge Defense and Appealing of Judicial Acts
Public security department 
Department for the protection of state interests 
Legal department 
Department for international legal cooperation
Department for corruption and economic crimes 
Department of organization legal assistance
IT department
Secretariat
Protocol department
Division of public relations
Internal audit division
Staff management division
Organizational division
Statistics and analysis division
Military Prosecutor 
Investigation division
Supervision division 
Division for the protection of state interests 
Garrison offices
Yerevan Garrison Military Prosecutor’s Office
Goris Garrison Military Prosecutor’s Office
Lori Garrison Military Prosecutor’s Office
Sevan Garrison Military Prosecutor’s Office
Shirak Garrison Military Prosecutor’s Office
Yeghegnadzor Garrison Military Prosecutor’s Office
Garrison № 1 Military Prosecutor’s Office
Garrison № 2 Military Prosecutor’s Office
Garrison № 3 Military Prosecutor’s Office
City of Yerevan prosecutors offices:
Prosecutor's Office of Yerevan City
Prosecutor's Office of the Avan and Nor-Nork Districts
Prosecutor's Office of the Malatia-Sebastia District
Prosecutor's Office of the Ajapnyak and Davtashen Districts
Prosecutor's Office of the Arabkir and Kanaker-Zeytun Districts
Prosecutor's Office of the Erebuni and Nubarashen Districts
Prosecutor's Office of the Kentron and Nork-Marash Districts
Prosecutor's Office of Shengavit Administrative District
Regional prosecutor's offices:
Prosecutor's Office of Aragatsotn Region
Prosecutor's Office of Ararat Region
Prosecutor's Office of Armavir Region
Prosecutor's Office of Gegharkunik Region
Prosecutor's Office of Kotayk Region
Prosecutor's Office of Shirak Region
Prosecutor's Office of Lori Region
Prosecutor's Office of Syunik Region
Prosecutor's Office of Vayots Dzor Region
Prosecutor's Office of Tavush Region
Territorial divisions

List of Prosecutors General
 Suren Osipyan (1971–1988)
 Vladimir Nazaryan (1988–1990)
 Artavazd Gevorgyan (1990–1997)
 Henrik Khachatryan (1997–1998)
 Zhirayr Kharatyan (1998)
 Aghvan Hovsepyan (1998–1999)
 Boris Nazaryan (1999–2001)
 Aram Tamazyan (2001–2004)
 Aghvan Hovsepyan (2004—2013)
 Gevorg Kostanyan (2013–2016)
 Artur Davtyan (2016–2022)
 Anna Vardapetyan (2022–present)

See also

 Constitutional Court of Armenia
 Constitution of Armenia

Sources

External links 
 Prosecutor General of Armenia

Law enforcement in Armenia
Prosecutors general